Sukrita Paul Kumar is an Indian poet, critic, and academician. She has been the chief editor of Cultural Diversity, Linguistic Plurality and Literary Traditions of India - a textbook prescribed by the University of Delhi for course use in its Honours B.A. programme.

Early life and background 

Sukrita Paul Kumar was born in Nairobi, Kenya and emigrated to India when Kenya obtained its freedom from the British. She was educated at Zakir Husain College, Hindu College and Government College of Arts and Sciences, Marathwada University, India.

Career 

As director of a UNESCO project on 'The Culture of Peace', she edited Mapping Memories - a volume of Urdu short stories from India and Pakistan. Many of her poems, have emerged from her experience of working with homeless people, tsunami victims, and street children.

Fellowships/Awards/Grants 

Sukrita Paul Kumar was awarded the Visitorship at Concordia University for the designing of a course on Indian Women and their Lives in 2009.

Books

Critical 

Narrating Partition: Texts, Interpretations, Ideas. Indialog Publications, New Delhi, 2004
 The New Story: A study of Literary Modernism in Urdu and Hindi Short Fiction. Indian Institute of Advanced Study, Shimla with Allied Publishers, New Delhi, 1990
 Conversations on Modernism: Dialogues with Writers, Critics and Philosophers. Indian Institute of Advanced Study, Shimla with  Allied Publishers, New Delhi, 1990
 Man, Woman and Androgyny: A study of the Novels of Theodore Dreiser, Scott Fitzgerald and Ernest Hemingway. Indus Publishing Co. New Delhi, 1989

Edited 

 The Dying Sun: Stories by Joginder Paul Edited by Sukrita Paul Kumar, HarperCollins, New Delhi, 2013
 Chamba Achamba  Co-Edited with Malashri Lal, Sahitya Akademi, New Delhi, 2012
 Speaking for Myself Co-Edited with Malashri Lal, Penguin India, New Delhi, 2009
 Crossing Over Co-Edited with Frank Stewart, University of Hawaii, Hawaii, 2009
 Interpreting Home in South Asia Co-Edited with Malashri Lal, Pearson Longman's, New Delhi, 2007
 Cultural Diversity, Linguistic Plurality and Literary Traditions of India Chief Editor: Sukrita Paul Kumar, Macmillan India, New Delhi, 2006 (Textbook prescribed by Delhi University as Concurrent Course for B.A Honours.)
 Women's Studies in India: Contours of Change  Edited by Sukrita Paul Kumar and Malashri Lal,
IIAS, Shimla, 2002. (Collection of Essays)

 Ismat, Her Life Her Times Edited by Sukrita Paul Kumar and Sadique. ALT (Approaching Literature through Translation) Series, Katha, New Delhi, 2000 (Critical Essays and Autobiographical Pieces on Ismat Chughtai.)
 Mapping Memories Edited by Sukrita Paul Kumar and Muhammad Ali Siddiqui. Katha, New Delhi, 1998
(Urdu stories from India and Pakistan translated into English. The same collection of stories in the original Urdu was published as Bazdeed by Katha, New Delhi, 1998

 Breakthrough Selected and Edited by Sukrita Paul Kumar. Indian Institute of Advanced Studies, Shimla, 1993
Modern Hindi and Urdu short stories (Translated into English)

Translated 

 Stories of Joginder Paul Joginder Paul. National Book Trust, New Delhi, 2003
(Translation of Urdu stories into English.)

 Sleepwalkers Joginder Paul. Katha, New Delhi, 2001
(A novel translated by Sunil Trivedi and Sukrita Paul Kumar.)

Poems 

 Seven Leaves, One Autumn Rajkamal Publications, New Delhi, 2011
 Poems Come Home (Bilingual, Translated by Gulzar) HarperCollins, New Delhi, 2011
 Rowing Together Rajkamal Publications, New Delhi, 2008
 Without Margins  Bibliophile South Asia, New Delhi, 2005
 Folds of Silence Kokil, New Delhi, 1996
 Apurna  Writer's Workshop, Calcutta, 1988
 Oscillations  Ashajanak Publishers, New Delhi, 1974

Appearances in the following poetry Anthologies 

 Travelogue : The Grand Indian Express (2018) ed. by Dr. Ananad Kumar and published by Authorspress, New Delhi

References

External links
Sukrita Paul Kumar at Penguin India

Living people
21st-century Indian women writers
English-language poets from India
Indian women translators
Indian women poets
International Writing Program alumni
21st-century Indian translators
Year of birth missing (living people)